Georgia is an unincorporated community in Cherry County, in the U.S. state of Nebraska.

History
The community was named for George A. Frost, a local carpenter.

References

Unincorporated communities in Cherry County, Nebraska
Unincorporated communities in Nebraska